"Morris Brown" is the second single from OutKast's sixth studio album, Idlewild. The song features guest vocals from Scar and Sleepy Brown, along with Janelle Monae, who lends her voice in the hook and on Sleepy Brown's verse  It is named after Morris Brown College and features the Morris Brown College Marching Wolverines. André 3000 produced the song, but does not appear on the track. The song was produced during the recording of the Stankonia tracks, but was not released. The single peaked at #43 in the UK, and peaked at #95 on the Billboard Hot 100 chart.

Track listings
UK CD1
 "Morris Brown" – 4:25
 "Mighty 'O'" – 4:16

UK CD2
 "Morris Brown" (clean version) – 4:25
 "Morris Brown" (dirty version) – 4:25
 "Morris Brown" (instrumental) – 4:25

10" limited edition vinyl single
 "Morris Brown" – 4:25
 "Idlewild Blue (Don'tchu Worry 'Bout Me)" – 4:15

12" vinyl single
 "Morris Brown" (clean version) – 4:25
 "Morris Brown" (clean instrumental) – 4:25
 "Morris Brown" (main version) – 4:25
 "Morris Brown" (main instrumental) – 4:25

Charts

References

2006 singles
Music videos directed by Bryan Barber
Outkast songs
Songs written by André 3000
Songs written by Big Boi